Cardinal Stefan Wyszyński University in Warsaw (UKSW) (Latin: Universitas Cardinalis Stephani Wyszyński Varsoviae) is a Polish state university created on the basis of the Academy of Catholic Theology in Warsaw. UKSW is a public university that offers education in the humanities, social studies, and natural sciences, and since 2019 medicine.

The university has 12 faculties located in two campuses in Warsaw's Bielany district: on Dewajtis and Wóycickiego Streets. The university offers 40 majors, including medicine, psychology, law, journalism, environmental engineering, Italian philology, and economics.

In 2016, Mazovian Laboratory Center of Life Sciences UKSW was established on the campus at the Wóycickiego Street. In 2019, the university received the European Commission's "HR Excellence in Research" award, confirming its adherence to the principles of the European Charter for Researchers. In addition, all faculties of the university are under the supervision of the Minister of Science and Higher Education, four of them (Faculty of Theology, Faculty of Christian Philosophy, Faculty of Canon Law and Faculty of Family Studies) are additionally supervised by church authorities.

History 

In 1954, the Faculty of Catholic Theology at the University of Warsaw and the Faculty of Theology at the Jagiellonian University were closed down. They were transformed into the Academy of Catholic Theology (ATK), whereas the Faculty of Evangelical Theology removed from the University of Warsaw became the basis for the establishment of the multidenominational Christian Theological Academy in Warsaw (ChAT). In the same year, the Marian Fathers were displaced from the Post-Camaldolese monastery in Bielany, Warsaw, and the newly founded ATK was given the abandoned monastery.

The Academy of Catholic Theology was a state university, established by a decision of the then Council of Ministers. Since according to canon law, theological faculties should be created or approved by the Holy See, the creation of the new university was ill-received by the ecclesial community. Primate Stefan Wyszyński, then archbishop of Warsaw, was imprisoned in the years 1953–1956. After regaining his freedom, he did not accept the university right away. It was only since 1960, with the approval of the Holy See, that he respected the academy and considered himself the great chancellor of the university. The Academy of Catholic Theology was granted full ecclesiastical rights in 1989, henceforth becoming both a state and a church university.

In 1954, the Academy of Catholic Theology employed 60 faculty members. There were 415 students studying there. It had three faculties: Faculty of Theology, Faculty of Canon Law, and Faculty of Christian Philosophy. The university was fully funded by the state. The number of students allowed to enroll was strictly determined by the communist authorities. It was not until the 1980s that the number of students increased significantly. In 1987, the Faculty of Church Historical and Social Sciences was created from a portion of the Faculty of Theology.

Further development of the university took place in the 1990s: the number of professors and students increased, new majors were opened. Changes within the institution allowed it to become a university. It took place on September 3, 1999, and the university was named after Cardinal Stefan Wyszyński.

Academic background 
The university consists of two main campuses: at ul. Dewajtis 5 in Bielany - Dewajtis Campus (in Bielański Forest) and at ul. Wóycickiego 1/3 in Młociny - Wóycickiego Campus. In the first one, in addition to teaching rooms, there is the Main Library and the headquarters of the university authorities.

Campus in Młociny is under continuous expansion. On February 14, 2008, the first part of the Center for Education and Interdisciplinary Research - Auditorium Maximum (building no. 21) was opened there. It is where lecture rooms, laboratories and a student canteen are located. In February 2009, Building 23, which houses the Faculty of Historical and Social Sciences, the Faculty of Christian Philosophy, and the Faculty of Biology and Environmental Sciences, was completed. In 2015, the newly built Life Sciences Laboratory Center (building 24) was opened. In 2020, a modern field house was put into use. Currently, the headquarters of the Faculty of Medicine. Collegium Medicum and Multidisciplinary Research Centre (MCB) in Dziekanowo Leśne are under construction.

The Wóycickiego Campus can be reached by several bus lines, including the line "114" leading directly to the campus gate from the Młociny subway station. To get to the Dewajtis Campus, one needs to walk about 1.1 km from the tram stop.

Authorities in 2020-2024 

 Rev. Prof. Dr. Hab. Ryszard Czekalski – His Magnificence Rector of the Cardinal Stefan Wyszyński University in Warsaw
 Dr. Hab. Anna Fidelus, Associate Professor – Vice-Rector for Student Affairs and Teaching
 Rev. Dr. Hab. Marek Stokłosa, Associate Professor – Vice-Rector for Research and International Cooperation

Rectors

ATK 

 1954-1956 – Rev. Prof. Jan Czuj
 1956-1965 – Rev. Prof. Wincenty Kwiatkowski
 1965-1972 – Rev. Prof. Józef Iwanicki
 1972-1981 – Rev. Prof. Jan Piotr Stępień
 1981-1987 – Rev. Prof. Remigiusz Sobański
 1987-1990 – Rev. Prof. Helmut Juros
 1990-1996 – Rev. Prof. Jan Łach
 1996-1999 – Rev. Prof. Roman Bartnicki

UKSW 

 1999-2005 – Rev. Prof. Dr. Hab. Roman Bartnicki
 2005-2010 – Rev. Prof. Dr. Hab. Ryszard Rumianek
 2010-2012 – Rev. Prof. Dr. Hab. Henryk Skorowski
 2012-2020 – Rev. Prof. Dr. Hab. Stanisław Dziekoński
 since 2020 - Rev. Prof. Dr. Hab. Ryszard Czekalski

Doctors Honoris Causa

ATK 

 1982 – Card. Józef Glemp
 1983 – Rev. Prof. Josef Georg Ziegler
 1986 – Br. Roger Schütz
 1989 – Rev. Prof. Édouard Boné
 1989 – Rev. Msgr. Dr. Antoni Liedtke
 1990 – Rev. Prof. Lothar Ullrich
 1990 – Fr. Józef Maria Bocheński
 1991 – Abp Ignacy Tokarczuk
 1992 – Rev. Prof. Norbert Höslinger
 1992 – Card. Franciszek Macharski
 1993 – Fr. Hans Waldenfels S.I.
 1993 – Henryk Mikołaj Górecki
 1994 – Card. Jozef Tomko
 1994 – Fr. Feliks Bednarski
 1995 – Prof. Alicja Grześkowiak
 1996 – Rev. Prof. Gabriel Adrianyi
 1996 – Bp Paul Nordhues
 1997 – Bp Karl Lehmann
 1997 – Prof. Joseph Isensee
 1998 – Card. Zenon Grocholewski

UKSW

Students and Staff 
In the 2020/2021 academic year, about 10,000 students study at the UKSW, and about 800 academic teachers are employed. There are 300 employees in the library, administration and service.

There are many student organizations at the university, including the Student Government, UKSW Independent Students' Union, UKSW Erasmus Student Network and scientific clubs.

Faculties and Majors 
Cardinal Stefan Wyszyński University currently has twelve faculties and over forty majors, such as:

 Faculty of Theology:

 Institute of Theological Sciences: theology (general theology, theology, specialization: teaching - catechetical, missiology, coaching and social mediation, biblical lands tourism studies), religious studies
 Institute of Media Education and Journalism: journalism and social communication, theology (media education and journalism)

 Faculty of Canon Law: Canon Law
 Faculty of Christian Philosophy:

 Institute of Philosophy: philosophy, philosophy and culture of East-Central Europe
 Institute of Psychology: psychology
 Center for Ecology and Ecophilosophy: environment conservation, sustainability studies

 Faculty of Historical Sciences:

 Institute of Archaeology: archaeology, management of cultural heritage
 Institute of History of Art: history of art, cultural property and environmental protection
 Institute of History: history, history (history of Mediterranean civilization)

 Faculty of Social and Economic Sciences:

 Institute of Political Sciences and Administration: political science, European studies, internal security
 Institute of Sociology: sociology, social work
 Institute of Economics and Finance: economy

 Faculty of Law and Administration: law, administration, international relations, man in cyberspace
 Faculty of Humanities:

 Institute of Polish Philology: polish philology
 Institute of Classical Philology and Cultural Studies: classical philology, Italian philology, cultural studies, museology

 Faculty of Family Studies: family studies
 Faculty of Mathematics and Natural Sciences. School of Exact Sciences.:

 Institute of Chemistry: chemistry
 Institute of Computer Science: computer science
 Institute of Mathematics: mathematics
 Physics Department: physics

 Faculty of Education: philosophy of education and special pedagogy
 Faculty of Biology and Environmental Sciences: biology and environmental engineering
 Faculty of Medicine. Collegium Medicum: medicine, nursing

See also 

 Science2Business
 The Main Library of the Cardinal Stefan Wyszyński University in Warsaw
 Scientific Publishing of the Cardinal Stefan Wyszyński University in Warsaw
 Center for Digital Science and Technology
 Digital Museum of the Cardinal Stefan Wyszyński University in Warsaw
 Community Mental Health Center for Children and Youth
 UKSW Non-public Kindergarten

References list 

Universities and colleges in Warsaw
Bielany
Universities in Poland
Cardinal Stefan Wyszyński University in Warsaw